Puritan Bennett has been a provider of respiratory products since 1913 originally as a medical gas supplier. In addition to critical care ventilation, Puritan Bennett provided medical devices for patients outside of the acute care environment. Its products included portable ventilation, oxygen therapy systems, sleep diagnostic and sleep therapy equipment, spirometry and other respiratory care products.

History
In 1913, Parker B. Francis founded the predecessor to Puritan-Bennett, originally incorporated as Oxygen Gas Company, which was a manufacturer and distributor of oxygen and hydrogen. In 1920 the company changed its name to the Kansas City Oxygen Company and then again in 1931 to Puritan Compressed Gas Corporation as it continued to expand. In 1940, V. Ray Bennett and Associates, Inc was founded by Ray Bennett in Santa Monica, CA. In 1945 Bennett applies for a patent for the BR-X2 ventilator developed during WWII for delivery of intermittent positive pressure ventilation to pilots after he witnessed several crashes caused by pilots passing out in unpressurized aircraft at high altitude. He would later invent a mechanical ventilator as an alternative to the iron lung machine. V. Ray Bennett and Associates, Inc was acquired by Puritan in 1956 and the next year the company was renamed Bennett Respiration Products, Inc. By the 60's the company had added products such as the bubble jet and a heated humidifier to its oxygen therapy line. In 1967 Puritan  released the MA-1 Volume Ventilator, an invention of Bennet's. This virtually replaced the cumbersome iron lung and made Bennet and Puritan recognizable names in the larger medical equipment field. This allowed the company to grow even more as they targeted international markets. In 1968 the parent company reorganized itself as the Puritan-Bennett Corporation and consolidated its medical marketing department into a single unit.

In 1995, Nellcor acquired Puritan-Bennett and the newly expanded company was renamed Nellcor Puritan Bennett. In 1997, Nellcor Puritan Bennett became a part of Mallinckrodt, a medical products company with product lines in respiratory care, diagnostic imaging and analgesic pharmaceuticals. In 1998, Puritan-Bennett Aero Systems (PBASCO) was sold to BE Aerospace Inc.

In 2000, Tyco International acquired Mallinckrodt to become a Tyco Healthcare company. In 2007, Covidien spun off from Tyco International and inherited Puritan Bennett along with other Tyco Healthcare Brands.

In 2015, Medtronic acquired Covidien and inherited all brands, including Puritan Bennett.

Ventilators

840 Ventilator System
The 840 Ventilator System is the old-fashioned acute critical care ventilator sold by Puritan Bennett. Launched in some countries older than 2001. It is the flagship product in Puritan Bennett's line of critical care ventilators.

Software Options: 

 PAV+ Software
 BiLevel Software
 Volume Ventilation Plus Software
 Tube Compensation Software
 NeoMode Software

700 Series
 The 700 Series (740 & 760) Ventilator System is a critical care ventilator model prior to the current 840 Series. The system was designed in Galway, Ireland.

7200 Series
The 7200 Series is a critical care ventilator model prior to the 760 Series.

560 Series
The 560 Series is a portable ventilation unit.

Bennett MA-1 
The Bennett MA-1 ventilator was a volume-cycled, constant flow generator that had three adjustable modes: assist, control, or assist-control. This model was the most commonly used ventilators in clinical practice.

Bennett TV-2P and Bennett PR-2 
Oldest devices utilised for intermittent positive-pressure breathing (IPPB) therapy. These models were used in WW2 because the units were small, compact and easy to use.

References

Medical equipment